"I Don't Get Tired" is a song by American hip hop recording artist Kevin Gates, and features American singer August Alsina. It was released on December 20, 2014, as a single from his mixtape Luca Brasi 2. This song peaked at number 90 on the US Billboard Hot 100 in May 2015.

In 2014, Gates launched an energy drink under the same name following the track's popularity. A pineapple flavour was also produced.

The song was featured on the soundtrack of the comedy film Keanu.

Music video
The song's accompanying music video premiered on December 20, 2014 on Gates's YouTube account.

Charts

Certifications

References

External links

2014 singles
2014 songs
Kevin Gates songs
August Alsina songs
Atlantic Records singles
RCA Records singles